The Permanent Representative of Australia to the International Civil Aviation Organization is an officer of the Australian Department of Infrastructure, Transport, Regional Development, Communications and the Arts and the head of the delegation of the Commonwealth of Australia to the Council of the International Civil Aviation Organization (ICAO) in Montreal, Canada. The position has the rank and status of an Ambassador Extraordinary and Plenipotentiary and is one of Australia's representatives to the United Nations and its other constituent agencies. The Australian nominee to the Air Navigation Commission, a body that works towards the uniformity in regulations, standards and procedures which will facilitate and improve air navigation to international standards, acts as the deputy to the Permanent Representative.

The current permanent representative is Ross Adams since September 2021. 

Australia has been a member of ICAO since its establishment, with the permanent mission based in Montreal, now at 999 Robert-Bourassa Boulevard. Australia sent a delegation to the 1944 Chicago Conference, and became a party of the Convention on International Civil Aviation which was resolved at its end on 7 December 1944. Australian first sent a permanent representative to serve on the Council of the Provisional International Civil Aviation Organization (PICAO) which began operating on 6 June 1945 and was replaced by ICAO on 7 April 1947.

List of Permanent Representatives

See also
Australia and the United Nations

References

External links
ICAO – International Civil Aviation Organization
Department of Infrastructure, Transport, Regional Development, Communications and the Arts
Australian Government involvement in ICAO groups
International Civil Aviation Organization (ICAO)

 
ICAO